Rarmani River Miguel Joseph Edmonds-Green (born 14 January 1999) is an English professional footballer who plays as a defender for Huddersfield Town.

Club career
Edmonds-Green was born in Peckham, Greater London, and was previously at the Nike Academy as a youngster before signing for Huddersfield Town on his 17th birthday in January 2016. He quickly became captain of the under-18's side in the 2016–17 season, before moving up to the under-23's side in 2017.

His first piece of first team action came for Brighouse Town in the Northern Premier League Division One East, where he helped them win the play-offs, but due to an unusual rule regarding the arrangement of teams in their level of the football pyramid, they were not promoted.

He then was sent on loan by new Huddersfield Town manager Danny Cowley in October 2019, when he joined National League side Bromley, who he played for in 7 games, before being recalled by Huddersfield, where he then made his league debut in a 1–0 win over Charlton Athletic. Edmonds-Green had made his debut in a 1–0 defeat against Lincoln City (then managed by Cowley) in the EFL Cup earlier in the season. Edmonds-Green joined Swindon Town in January 2020 on loan until the end of the 2019–20 season. He scored his first professional goal in a 1-1 draw with Carlisle United on 8 February 2020.

He scored his first goal for Huddersfield in a 2–1 defeat to Barnsley on 26 December 2020.

On 4 August 2021, Edmonds-Green joined EFL League One side Rotherham United on a season long loan. He scored his first goal for the club on 2 October 2021, a 22-yard strike against Cheltenham Town.

On 1 September 2022, he joined EFL Championship side Wigan Athletic on a season-long loan. However, his loan was terminated on 11 January 2023.

Career statistics

Honours
Swindon Town
EFL League Two: 2019–20

Rotherham United
League One runner-up: 2021–22
EFL Trophy: 2021–22

References

External links

2000 births
Living people
Footballers from Peckham
English footballers
Association football defenders
Huddersfield Town A.F.C. players
Bromley F.C. players
Swindon Town F.C. players
Rotherham United F.C. players
National League (English football) players
English Football League players